Ali Jalla Abdul Jalil Shah II (died 1597) was the Sultan of Johor from 1571 to 1597.

Ali Jalla Abdul Jalil Shah II married Fatima Raja the sister of Muzaffar II of Johor who was the sultan of Johor.  On Muzaffar's death, Ali Jalla and Fatima's son Abdul Jalil I of Johor became the sultan.  He died less than a year later and Ali Jalla was then made the sultan.

During Johor's reign Johor Lama was rebuilt and became a major center of trade in the Malay Peninsula.  In 1576 and 1578 the Portuguese tried to take it over but were repulsed both times by the Malays.

Sources
article on the River Forts of Johor
article translated from Malay by google translate on the Sultans of Johor

1597 deaths
Sultans of Johor
Year of birth unknown
16th-century monarchs in Asia